Nigerian state governors are normally elected for a four-year term during the national elections. In some cases, the first officeholder may be replaced by another, for example through death, impeachment or if an election is annulled. Following is a list of all Nigerian state governors who held office during the 2007–2011 term. Acting governors are not shown.

See also
Nigerian state governors 2011–2015 term
Nigerian state governors 2003–2007 term

 2007